This is a list of adult fiction books that topped The New York Times Fiction Best Seller list in 1964. Only four books topped the list that year, the list being dominated for 34 weeks by John le Carré's spy novel The Spy Who Came in from the Cold. The prolific novelist Louis Auchincloss had his only No. 1 bestseller that year (and only for one week at the top, though it lasted 33 weeks in the top 5).

References

1964
.
1964 in the United States